The 1976 Plymouth City Council election took place on 6 May 1976 to elect members of Plymouth City Council in England. This was on the same day as other local elections. Voting took place across 22 wards, each electing 3 Councillors. The Conservative Party retained control of the Council after winning a majority of seats.

Overall results

|-
| colspan=2 style="text-align: right; margin-right: 1em" | Total
| style="text-align: right;" | 66
| colspan=5 |
| style="text-align: right;" | 80,303
| style="text-align: right;" |

Ward results

Compton (3 seats)

Crownhill (3 seats)

Drake (3 seats)

Efford (3 seats)

Ernesettle (3 seats)

Ford (3 seats)

Honicknowle (3 seats)

Mount Gould (3 seats)

Pennycross (3 seats)

Plympton Erle (3 seats)

Plympton St Mary (3 seats)

Plymstock Dunstone (3 seats)

Plymstock Radford (3 seats)

St Andrew (3 seats)

St Aubyn (3 seats)

St Budeax (3 seats)

St Peter (3 seats)

Stoke (3 seats)

Sutton (3 seats)

Tamerton (3 seats)

Trelawny (3 seats)

Whitleigh (3 seats)

References

1976 English local elections
May 1976 events in the United Kingdom
1976